Thomas Strauß (born 15 December 1953) is a German rower who competed for West Germany in the 1976 Summer Olympics.

In 1976 he and his partner Peter van Roye won the bronze medal in the coxless pairs event.

External links
 profile

1953 births
Living people
Olympic rowers of West Germany
Rowers at the 1976 Summer Olympics
Olympic bronze medalists for West Germany
Olympic medalists in rowing
West German male rowers
Medalists at the 1976 Summer Olympics